The 2022 World Series of Poker Online was the third annual series of online poker tournaments organized by the World Series of Poker (WSOP).

GGPoker Schedule
Key: (bracelet number for 2022/bracelet number for career)

Main Event

*Career statistics prior to the Main Event

WSOP.com Schedule
Key: (bracelet number for 2022/bracelet number for career)

Nevada and New Jersey

Michigan

Pennsylvania

References

External links
Official website

World Series of Poker
World Series of Poker